Natalie Kononenko is a professor of folklore currently with the University of Alberta. Kononenko is a major contributor to the study of Ukrainian Blind Minstrels as well as in the area of witchcraft in Slavic cultures.  She currently holds the Peter and Doris Kule Chair of Ukrainian Ethnography and is the head of the Slavic and East European section of Modern Languages and Cultural Studies.  She attended Radcliffe College and Harvard University.

Publications

 Kononenko, N. (1997) Ukrainian Minstrels: And the Blind Shall Sing. M.E. Sharpe. 
 Kononenko, N. (1990) The Turkish Minstrel Tale Tradition. Garland Publishing Inc. 
 Kononenko, N. (2007) Slavic Folklore: A Handbook. Greenwood Press.

See also 
 Blind musicians
 Bandurist
 Duma (epic)

References

External links 
 Natalie Kononenko: Instructor Page at University of Alberta

Year of birth missing (living people)
Living people
Academic staff of the University of Alberta
Radcliffe College alumni